Julienne Bušić (born Julienne Eden Schultz; September 20, 1948) is an American writer, activist, widow and co-conspirator of Zvonko Bušić. She was arrested with Bušić in 1976 after hijacking TWA Flight 355 and sentenced to life in prison, with early parole.

Life
According to her memoir, she was born in Eugene, Oregon, United States, and was raised in Portland, Oregon. She graduated from the University of Oregon, attended Vienna University (Austria), and obtained a master's degree in German language, literature, and linguistics at Portland State University. In Oregon, she worked as a nurse's aid, teacher, and mental health therapist for abused teenagers.

She married Zvonko Bušić in 1972 and they lived together in Austria, Germany, Oregon, and Ohio before moving to New York City. They were active in publicizing human rights abuses in the former Yugoslavia, especially the murder of Croatian dissidents by the Yugoslav secret police organization UDBA in the so-called "black program," and in promoting the cause of Croatian independence. Julienne Bušić and a friend were imprisoned briefly in Zagreb in the early 1970s for disseminating literature critical of the Yugoslavian government.

On September 10, 1976, she, her husband, and three others hijacked domestic Trans World Airlines flight 355 departing from New York for Chicago, using the threat of a bomb. While refueling the hijacked plane at Montreal's Mirabel International Airport, they told officials that they had planted a bomb in a locker at Grand Central Terminal and gave them instructions on finding it. They demanded that an appeal to the American people concerning Croatia's independence be printed in the New York Times, the Washington Post, the Chicago Tribune, the Los Angeles Times, and the International Herald Tribune. The plane was then flown to Gander, Newfoundland, where 35 of its passengers were released. From there the plane was accompanied by a larger TWA plane that guided it to Keflavík, Iceland. The hijackers' initial European destination was London, but the British government refused them permission to land.

During the hijacking the device at Grand Central Terminal was found and taken to Rodman's Neck Firing Range where police attempted to dismantle it rather than detonate it. This bomb exploded, killing NYPD officer Brian Murray and wounding another, Terrence McTigue. The hijackers had the airliner flying over London, where they dropped pamphlets promoting Croatian independence from Yugoslavia. The group surrendered without bloodshed, with their onboard bomb proving to be a harmless pressure cooker.

Zvonko and Julienne Bušić were convicted of air piracy resulting in death, which carried a mandatory life sentence with parole eligibility after 10 years. In 1979, she was attacked in prison by Manson Family member Lynette Fromme. She was released from federal prison in 1989 after serving 13 years in the minimum security Federal Correctional Institution, Dublin in Dublin, California.

During and after her stint in prison, Bušić corresponded at length with Kathleen Murray Moran, the wife of the bomb squad member killed during the incident. Murray Moran advocated for Bušić's early release.  Murray Moran would later, quite publicly, regret that advocacy. In 1982, Murray filed a lawsuit against the NYPD, charging gross negligence in the handling of the explosives, which "caused the death of Officer
Murray".

Bušić subsequently moved to Croatia and has supported Croatian political causes in the United States and Europe. She has been involved in publishing, translation, and literary projects, and written for literary journals both in Croatia and the United States, including Ooligan Press, Verbatim, Gobshite Quarterly, and Vijenac. She is also a weekly columnist for the Croatian news portal Dalje. Her husband was granted parole in 2008, at which time he rejoined his wife in Croatia. Zvonko Bušić committed suicide in 2013.

In January 2020 she took part in a controversial Croatian Democratic Union ad to support the re-election of Kolinda Grabar-Kitarović as the President of Croatia.

Books
Her first book, Lovers and Madmen (2000), chronicles her relationship with Zvonko and the death threats and attempts on their lives that led up to the hijacking. Her second book, Your Blood and Mine (2008), is an extended commentary on the American federal prison system, as portrayed by her letters to Zvonko throughout his 32-year incarceration.  Her third book, Living Cells (2012) is a true story of a Croatian woman held as a sex slave during the siege of Vukovar.

In media
Bušić is featured prominently in the radio show Unforgiven.  The segment of the show titled The Hijacker's Letter features information on the relationship that developed between Bušić and Kathleen Murray Moran, widow of Brian Murray, the officer killed by her bomb.

References

External links
Zvonko and Julienne Busic's official website

Living people
1948 births
Croatian non-fiction writers
Hijackers
21st-century American women writers
21st-century Croatian writers
People imprisoned on charges of terrorism
American expatriates in Austria
Writers from Eugene, Oregon
American people convicted of murdering police officers
American prisoners sentenced to life imprisonment
University of Oregon alumni
Portland State University alumni
American emigrants to Croatia
Writers from Portland, Oregon
People paroled from life sentence
People convicted of murder by the United States federal government
Prisoners sentenced to life imprisonment by the United States federal government